The amplitude of accommodation is the maximum potential increase in optical power that an eye can achieve in adjusting its focus. It refers to a certain range of object distances for which the retinal image is as sharply focussed as possible.

Amplitude of accommodation is measured during routine eye-examination.  The closest that a normal eye can focus is typically about 10 cm for a child or young adult.  Accommodation then decreases gradually with age, effectively finishing just after age fifty.

The average amplitude of accommodation, in diopters, for a patient of a given age was estimated by Hofstetter in 1950 to be 18.5 − (0.30 * patient age in years) with the minimum amplitude of accommodation as 15 − (0.25 * age in years), and the maximum as 25 − (0.40 * age in years).  However, Hofstetter's work was based on data from two early surveys which, although widely cited, used methodology with considerable inherent error. (Donders, Sheard, Duane, Turner for reference)

See also
Convergence insufficiency
Eye examination
Negative relative accommodation
Positive relative accommodation
Presbyopia

References

Ophthalmology